"The Boy from New York City" is a song originally recorded by the American soul group The Ad Libs, released in 1964 as their first single. 
Produced by Jerry Leiber and Mike Stoller, the song peaked at No. 8 on the US Billboard Hot 100 on the chart week of February 27, 1965. Though the group continued to record other singles, they never repeated the chart success of "The Boy from New York City". According to Artie Butler, the track was recorded at A&R Studios in New York, in three separate sessions. The first session was to lay down the rhythm section, then the next session was for the lead and backup vocals, with the last session was just for the horns.

Chart history

Weekly charts

Year-end charts

Manhattan Transfer and Darts covers

The song was later covered by Darts and The Manhattan Transfer, both becoming chart hits in the UK and US respectively. Darts peaked at No. 2 in the UK Singles Chart in May 1978, while The Manhattan Transfer's version, featuring Janis Siegel on lead, peaked at No. 7 on the US Billboard Hot 100 in August 1981. The song also inspired a response song by The Beach Boys, "The Girl from New York City", from their 1965 album Summer Days (And Summer Nights!!).
The Manhattan Transfer version was used by pro wrestler Boogie Woogie Man Jimmy Valiant as his theme music during his tenure with Jim Crockett promotions in the 1980s.

The Manhattan Transfer
 Cheryl Bentyne – vocals
 Tim Hauser – vocals
 Alan Paul – vocals, vocal arrangement
 Janis Siegel – vocals

Additional Musicians
David Foster - acoustic piano
Dean Parks, Jay Graydon - guitar
Abe Laboriel - bass guitar
Mike Baird - drums
Don Roberts – saxophone
Jerry Hey - trumpet

Chart history (Darts)

Weekly charts

Year-end charts

Chart history (Manhattan Transfer)

Weekly charts

Year-end charts

Track listing
"The Boy from New York City" - 2:50
"Kicked Around" - 1:47

References

24. ^ https://artiebutler.com/boy-from-new-york-city/.

External links
 
 
 Lyrics of this song
 Entry at 45cat.com
 

1964 debut singles
1965 singles
1981 singles
Atlantic Records singles
1964 songs
The Manhattan Transfer songs